Radio Mirraya 101 FM, is a radio station  based in Juba operated and owned by United Nations mission in South Sudan.

Background 
It covers South Sudan and began broadcasting in South Sudan since June 30, 2006.

It provides news and information 24 hours, 7 days a week in English and Arabic. It is the fifth UN radio station operating on behalf of UN peace operation in 2006.

References

Radio stations in South Sudan
Radio stations established in 2006
2006 establishments in Africa
News and talk radio stations
English-language radio stations
Arabic-language radio stations